Udea delineatalis is a moth in the family Crambidae. It was described by Francis Walker in 1875. It is found on Saint Helena. The habitat consists of open grassy slopes.

References

Moths described in 1875
delineatalis